Professor John Frederick Adrian Sprent DSc, CBE, FAA (1915-2010) born in Mill Hill, England was an Australian veterinary scientist and parasitologist.

References

Fellows of the Australian Academy of Science
1915 births
2010 deaths
Australian Commanders of the Order of the British Empire
Australian veterinarians
Male veterinarians